William Hale White (22 December 183114 March 1913), known by his pseudonym Mark Rutherford, was a British writer and civil servant.  His obituary in The Times stated that the "employment of a pseudonym, and sometimes of two (for some of 'Mark Rutherford's' work was 'edited by his friend,  Reuben Shapcott'), was sufficient to prove a retiring disposition, and Mr. Hale White was little before the world in person."

Life, career and memorials

White was born in Bedford.  His father, William White, a member of the Nonconformist community of the Bunyan Meeting, became well known as a doorkeeper at the House of Commons and wrote sketches of parliamentary life for the Illustrated Times. A selection of his parliamentary sketches was published posthumously, in 1897, by Justin McCarthy, the Irish nationalist MP, as The Inner Life of the House of Commons.

White himself was educated in Bedford at Bedford Modern School, then known as the English School, until the family moved to London. In 1848 he entered the Countess of Huntingdon's College, Cheshunt to train for the Congregational Ministry. He developed increasingly unconventional views and in 1850 wrote to Thomas Carlyle who responded with a full reply encouraging him to stand by his convictions. White later entered New College, London, but the further development of his views prevented him taking up that career and he was expelled for questioning aspects of scripture. Hale White became known as a dissenter.

In 1852 he was employed by John Chapman to work as a personal assistant and subscription tout at The Westminster Review. White was an early proponent of women's rights. Having worked alongside her for The Westminster Review, White was a friend of George Eliot and they both lodged at 142 Strand, London which was owned by John Chapman. White wrote an article about his friendship with George Eliot for The Bookman in August 1902 entitled George Eliot as I knew her.

In 1854, White joined the civil service, first as a clerk at the Registrar General's Office at Somerset House and later as a clerk at the Admiralty. In 1861 he began writing newspaper articles to increase his income, having met and married Harriet Arthur in 1856 at the Congregational Church in Kentish Town, and started a family.

As a journalist he wrote for The Aberdeen Herald, The Birmingham Post, The Morning Star, The Nonconformist, The Rochdale News and The Scotsman.  Over fourteen years he wrote parliamentary sketches for The Birmingham Post. He also contributed articles on literary figures in The Contemporary Review, Macmillan's Magazine, The Spectator, The Athenaeum, The Bookman and, the nonconformist, The British Weekly, including essays on Byron, Goethe, Shelley and Dorothy Wordsworth.

White had already served his apprenticeship to journalism before he made his name, or rather his pen name, "Mark Rutherford", famous with three novels, supposedly edited by one Reuben Shapcott: The Autobiography of Mark Rutherford (1881), Mark Rutherford's Deliverance (1885) and The Revolution in Tanner's Lane (1887). George Orwell described Deliverance as "one of the best novels in English."

Under his own name White translated Spinoza's Ethics (1883). His later books include Miriam's Schooling, and Other Papers (1890), Catherine Furze (2 vols, 1893), Clara Hopgood (1896), Pages from a Journal, with Other Papers (1900), and John Bunyan (1905).

Hale White died in Groombridge on 14 March 1913 at the age of 81. One of his obituaries stated that:

André Gide recommended Hale White's work to Arnold Bennett in a letter dated 4 October 1915. Gide so admired The Autobiography of Mark Rutherford and Deliverance that he considered writing French translations. He stated that Rutherford had lifted him out of the 'slough of despond', a reference coined by Bunyan about whom Rutherford had written.

D. H. Lawrence wrote about White's work:

Claire Tomalin, the biographer of Charles Dickens and Thomas Hardy, wrote that White's novels:

Mark Rutherford School in Bedford is named after him and he has a blue commemorative plaque at 19 Park Hill in Carshalton. There is also a plaque above his birthplace in Bedford that was unveiled by his son, Sir William Hale-White. When he retired from the Admiralty in 1892, he lived in Hastings for a number of years where a memorial plaque commemorates him.

Family
White's first wife, Harriet, died in 1891 of multiple sclerosis. Two of their children had died in infancy.
In 1907, the widower White met aspiring novelist Dorothy Vernon Horace Smith, the daughter of Horace Smith who was a magistrate and minor poet. They fell in love and were married three and a half years later, but enjoyed only two years of married life before his death. At the time of her marriage to White, Dorothy was forty-five years his junior.

His eldest son by his first wife, Sir William Hale-White, was a distinguished doctor. His second son, Jack, married Agnes Hughes, one of Arthur Hughe's daughters. Arthur Hughes had himself produced a crayon drawing of Hale White in 1887. A third son became an engineer, and White's daughter Molly remained at home to care for her father.

Selected publications
The Autobiography of Mark Rutherford: Dissenting Minister, Trubner and Co., London, 1881
Spinoza's Ethics, translated from the Latin, Trubner and Co., London, 1883
Mark Rutherford's Deliverance, Trubner and Co., London, 1885
The Revolution in Tanner's Lane, Trubner and Co., London, 1887
Miriam's Schooling Kegan Paul, Trench, Trubner and Co., London, 1890
Catharine Furze, T. Fisher Unwin, London, 1893
Clara Hopgood, T. Fisher Unwin, London, 1896
An Examination of the Charge of Apostasy against Wordsworth, Longman, 1898 
Pages from a Journal, with Other Papers, T. Fisher Unwin, London, 1900
John Bunyan, Hodder & Stoughton, London, 1905
More Pages From a Journal, Oxford University Press, 1910
The Early Life of Mark Rutherford (W. Hale White), Oxford University Press, 1913
The Last Pages from a Journal, Oxford University Press, 1915. Published posthumously and prefaced by his widow, Dorothy

Selected work as editor or note contributor
A Description of the Wordsworth and Coleridge Manuscripts in the Possession of Mr. T. Norton Longman, Longman, 1897. Notes by W. Hale White
Johnson, Samuel. Selections from Dr. Samuel Johnson's Rambler, Clarendon Press, Oxford, 1907. Edited with Preface and Notes by W. Hale White
Carlyle, Thomas. The Life of John Sterling, Oxford University Press, 1907. With an introduction by W. Hale White

Quotes

Notes

References

External links

 
 
 
 
 Mark Rutherford Resource

19th-century English novelists
People from Bedford
People educated at Bedford Modern School
1831 births
1913 deaths
English male novelists
19th-century English male writers